Campbell is an unincorporated community in southern Coles County, Illinois, United States. The Embarras River and Fox Ridge State Park are approximately three miles to the east and the Lincoln Log Cabin State Historic Site is one mile south.

References

Unincorporated communities in Coles County, Illinois
Unincorporated communities in Illinois